Don Towsley may refer to:

Don Towsley (animator) (1912–1986), American animator
Don Towsley (computer scientist) (born 1949), American computer scientist